Nicolas Verrien (also spelled Nicolas Verien) was a French designer who drew monograms. He was active between 1685 and 1724. His monograms were used by artists ranging from goldsmiths to painters, locksmiths and sculptors. The artist Gérard Edelinck created a portrait of Verrien. Works by Verrien are held in the collection of the Cooper–Hewitt, National Design Museum.

References

Bibliography

 Catalogue de livres rares et précieux composant la bibliothèque de M. Hippolyte Destailleur... Paris : D. Morgand, 1891. 8°, 448 p.
 Belles écritures, [Catalogue de vente à prix marqués]. Paris, Librairie Paul Jammes, 1992.

External links

French decorative artists